Drycothaea ochreoscutellaris is a species of beetle in the family Cerambycidae. It was described by Breuning in 1940. It is known from Brazil, Ecuador, French Guiana and Suriname.

References

Calliini
Beetles described in 1940